Davoud Danesh-Jafari is an Iranian politician and economist who was minister of economy and finance affairs of Iran. He is currently member of the Expediency Discernment Council.

Biography
Born in 1954 in Tehran, Danesh-Jafari graduated with a bachelor's degree in civil engineering from Regional Engineering College, Srinagar (presently known as National Institute of Technology, Srinagar), India. In 1992 he received a master's degree in economics from Tehran University and in 2001 he obtained a PhD from Allameh Tabatabaii University. He was a member of the parliament in the 5th term and in the 7th term.

Since 2006 he was involved in plans to create the Iranian Oil Bourse, a commodity exchange for oil and oil byproducts, which would trade mostly in the Iranian currency and other major currencies In December 2006, he was reported as saying that he intended to reduce US dollar-based transactions as much as possible.

In January 2008, he announced that the Iranian Oil Bourse would be opened during the anniversary of the Islamic Revolution (February 1–11) a month later. Oil Minister Gholam Hossein Nozari later announced that Davoud Danesh-Jafari would become its head. The Oil Bourse opened on 17 February 2008 on Kish Island.

He served as the minister of economy and finance affairs in the cabinet of president Mahmoud Ahmedinejad from 2005 to 2008.

References

1954 births
Living people
Finance ministers of Iran
Members of the Expediency Discernment Council
20th-century Iranian economists
Alliance of Builders of Islamic Iran politicians
Society of Devotees of the Islamic Revolution politicians
Recipients of the Order of Fath
Members of the 5th Islamic Consultative Assembly
Members of the 7th Islamic Consultative Assembly
Jihad of Construction personnel of the Iran–Iraq War
Popular Front of Islamic Revolution Forces politicians
Presidential advisers of Iran
University of Kashmir alumni
University of Tehran alumni
Allameh Tabataba'i University alumni
Iranian campaign managers
Politicians from Tehran
21st-century Iranian economists